Beasts Clawing at Straws (Japanese: 藁にもすがる獣たち Wara ni mo sugaru kemonotachi) is a 2020 South Korean black comedy crime thriller film written and directed by Kim Yong-hoon as his debut feature film. Based on the 2011 Japanese novel of the same name by Keisuke Sone, it stars Jeon Do-yeon, Jung Woo-sung, Youn Yuh-jung, Bae Seong-woo, Shin Hyun-been, Jung Man-sik, Jin Kyung and Jung Ga-ram. It was released on February 19, 2020.

The film had its world premiere at the 49th International Film Festival Rotterdam on January 25, 2020 in the Tiger Competition.

Plot
Joong-man, stuck in a thankless job and forced to care for his ailing mother, finds a huge bag of money left in a sauna. Tae-young, a customs officer in debt to criminal Mr. Park, plots with one of Park's henchmen to run a lucrative scam on a "sucker" attempting to flee the country. Mi-ran, an escort with an abusive husband, finally sees a way out when one of her clients offers to murder him in exchange for a cut of his life insurance policy. The three characters all cross paths with dangerous people and get themselves into increasingly deeper trouble as they attempt to cheat their way towards the ultimate payout. At the end, Joong-man lost his house due to the fire set by Yeon-Hee to cover-up her murder of Park to get the money but after Yeon-Hee is killed by the Park's lieutenant to avenge his boss, she drops the key for the locker that contains her bag of money. Joong-man's wife, who worked as a cleaning lady in the airport, stumbleed upon the key and retrieved the money, enabling Joong-man to restart his life.  

The film is separated into six chapters: Debt, Sucker, Food Chain, Shark, Lucky Strike and Money Bag.

Cast

Main
 Jeon Do-yeon as Yeon-hee
 Jung Woo-sung as Tae-young
 Youn Yuh-jung as Soon-ja
 Bae Seong-woo as Joong-man
 Shin Hyun-bin as Mi-ran
 Jung Man-sik as Park Doo-man
 Jin Kyung as Young-sun
 Jung Ga-ram as Jin-tae

Supporting
 Bae Jin-woong as Catfish
 Heo Dong-won as Manager
 Kim Jun-han as Jae-hoon
 Park Ji-hwan as Carp

Special appearance
 Yoon Je-moon as Myung-goo

Production

Development
Japanese author Keisuke Sone, who wrote the novel on which the film is based, "is a fan of Korean films" and "was very welcoming" to the idea of a film adaptation according to director Kim Yong-hoon.

Casting
Director Kim Yong-hoon first showed his script to actress Jeon Do-yeon who accepted the offer and convinced Youn Yuh-jung to join the cast.

Filming
Principal photography began on August 30, 2018 and filming ended on November 30.

Release
Due to the COVID-19 pandemic, the film was postponed by a week (being released on February 19, 2020 instead of February 12), but the delay had little impact as the situation did not improve by then.

Reception

Critical response

Jay Weissberg of Variety said that "Beasts Clawing at Straws could just as well be called "Beasts Toying with Clichés" if it weren't such an amusing, echt Korean romp." For Neil Young of The Hollywood Reporter, "Beasts Clawing at Straws demands attention and patience, but thus happily ends up amply rewarding both." Wendy Ide of Screen International describes the film as an "almost Coen-sian tale of ordinary folks undone by greed [which] is a lot smarter than its occasionally crude execution would have you believe."

Accolades

See also
 List of 2020 box office number-one films in South Korea

References

External links
 
 
 

2020 films
2020 black comedy films
2020s Korean-language films
2020 crime thriller films
South Korean crime thriller films
South Korean black comedy films
Films based on Japanese novels
Films postponed due to the COVID-19 pandemic